Ammouri M'barek (1951 – 14 February 2015) was the renovator of the Moroccan Amazigh (Berber) Music, was born in 1951 in Irguiten, a small village located at the bottom of the High Atlas near Taroudannt town, in Taroudannt Province, Morocco.

Filmography 

Television
biography (Usman Band, "Ousmane"), On Tifawin Program Channel 1TV RTM Morocco, (2007)
Marrakech Express Program, On Channel 1TV RTM Morocco (2006)
Nostalgia Program, on 2M TV local and 2M TV MONDE MOROCCO

Discography

Albums

Songs

From 1978 Album - Nekk Dik A Nmun

From 2006 Album - Afulki

Concerts 
2006
 Amazigh-Berber Festival in Las Palmas, Canary Islands. (2006)
 Opening the festival Timitar in Agadir, Morocco. (2006) Watch, the Live performance. Excellent video by Festivaltimitar Mamenk ur Yalla Timitar 2006
 Release of his latest album Afulki (2006)

2008
 Imeâchar Festival of Tiznit. (2008)

2009
 Awtar Festival in March (2009)

2010
Festival in la cote d'Agadir -August 2010
Amazigh Great Evening (at The Mohammed V Sports Complex) in Casablanca - August 2010
Festival Imezwag in Imi n Tanoute - July 2010
Festival Igoudar in Idaougnidif - July 2010 -
6th Edition of the Amazigh Culture Festival in Fes - July 2010
Iklan Festival in Ouarzazate ( Hommage à Ammouri Mbarek) - April 2010

References

External links
  Ammouri-Mbarek.com Official website (French).
 Azawan, Ammouri Mbarek Biography
 Ammouri Mbarek on Youtube

1951 births
2015 deaths
20th-century Moroccan musicians
20th-century Moroccan male singers
21st-century Moroccan musicians
21st-century Moroccan male singers
Berber musicians
Shilha people